This is a list of music-related events in 1818.

Events 
 April 12 – Heinrich Stölzel and Friedrich Blühmel patent the first brass instrument valve.
 June 10 – The Teatro Nuovo at Pesaro in the Papal States of Italy opens with a performance of Gioacchino Rossini's La gazza ladra conducted by the composer in the town of his birth (the theatre is later renamed in his honor).
 September – Soprano Giuditta Pasta makes her Venice début.
 October 12 – The first National Theatre Munich opens as a home for the Bavarian State Opera with a performance of Ferdinand Fränzl's Die Weihe.
 October 16 – The first work for the newly invented valved horn is played, Concertino für drei Waldhörner und ein chromatisches Ventilhorn, by composer-performer Georg Abraham Schneider.
 December 24 – The Christmas carol "Silent Night" (Stille Nacht) with words by the priest Josef Mohr set to music by organist Franz Xaver Gruber is first performed at St. Nikolaus parish church in Oberndorf bei Salzburg in Austria.
date unknown
 Johann Nepomuk Schelble founds the Society of St Cecilia at Frankfurt.
 Beethoven receives the gift of a piano from Thomas Broadwood of the London manufacturers John Broadwood & Sons.

Bands formed
 Besses o' th' Barn brass band is formed in Whitefield, near Manchester, England, by this date.

Popular music 
 "The Crimson Banner", words and music by William Blacker
 "Silent Night" (words by Joseph Mohr, music by Franz Xaver Gruber)
 "Thou Bonnie Wood of Craigielea" (words by Robert Tannahill, music by James Barr)

Classical music
All of the following items are found in the IMSLP/Petrucci Music Library.
George Anderson – The Battle of Waterloo
Heinrich Baermann – Clarinet Concertino, Op. 29
Bernhard Henrik Crusell – Clarinet Concerto No. 2, Op. 5
Franz Danzi 
Symphony in D major, P. 223
Concerto Concertant, P. 227
Clarinet Potpourri No. 2, P. 246
Flute Sonatina in D major, P. 257
Clarinet Sonata in B-flat major
Friedrich Dotzauer – Oboe Quartet, Op. 37
Federigo Fiorillo – 3 Duos, Op. 31
Mauro Giuliani – Variations on "Deh! calma oh ciel" from Othello, Op. 101
Johann Neopmuk Hummel – Adagio, Variationen und Rondo über ein russisches Thema, Op. 78
Franz Krommer – String Trio, Op. 96
Karol Józef Lipiński – Variations, Op. 5
Sigismund Neukomm – Symphony, Op. 19
George Onslow – 3 Piano Trios, Op. 14
Anton Reicha – Wind Quintets, Op. 88
Franz Schubert 
Adagio in D-flat major, D. 505
4 Polonaises, D. 599
3 Marches héroïques, D. 602
Fantasy in C major, D. 605a
March in E major, D. 606
Rondo in D major, D. 608
Die Geselligkeit, D. 609
Trio in E major, D. 610
Piano Sonata No.10, D. 613
Sonata for Piano Duet, D. 617
Polonaise in B-flat major, D. 618a
8 Variations on a French Song, D. 624
Piano Sonata No. 11, D.625
Blanka, D.631
3 Marches militaires, D.733
6 Grandes marches, D.819
Symphony No. 6
Louis Spohr - String Quartet No. 11 in E, Op. 43
Jan Václav Voříšek – 12 Rhapsodies, Op. 1
Ludwig van Beethoven – Piano Sonata in B flat "Hammerklavier" Op.106

Opera 
 Michele Carafa – Berenice in Siria
 Gaetano Donizetti – Enrico di Borgogna
 Giovanni Pacini – Atala
 Gioacchino Rossini – Mosè in Egitto

Births 
January 14 – Zacharias Topelius, lyricist and historian (died 1898)
February 6 or August 7– Henry Litolff, keyboard virtuoso and composer (d. 1891)
 March 1 (2) – Giulio Briccialdi, composer (d. 1881)
March 11 
Antonio Bazzini, composer and violinist (died 1897)
Marius Petipa, Russian ballet dancer (died 1910)
 March 31 – Carolina Granberg, Swedish ballerina (d. 1884) 
April 6 – Aasmund Olavsson Vinje, lyricist and author (died 1870)
 April 19 – Manuel Saumell, composer (d. 1870)
 June 17 – Charles Gounod, composer (d. 1893)
June 28 – Cesare Ciardi, composer and musician (died 1871)
 July 1 – Henrietta Treffz, operatic mezzo-soprano and first wife of Johann Strauss II (d. 1878)
August 7 – Henry Charles Litolff, composer and virtuoso (died 1891)
 September 12 – Theodor Kullak, pianist, composer and music teacher (d. 1882) 
 October 15 – Alexander Dreyschock, pianist and composer (d. 1869)
 October 26 – Stefano Golinelli, pianist and composer (d. 1891)
 Kurmangazy Sagyrbaev, Kazakh folk musician and composer (d. 1889)

Deaths 
 February 1 – Giuseppe Gazzaniga, composer (b. 1743)
 March 20 – Johann Nikolaus Forkel, music theorist (b. 1749)
 March 28 – Antonio Capuzzi, violinist and composer (b. 1755)
April 11 – Carl Andreas Göpfert, composer and musician (born 1768)
 May 7 – Leopold Kozeluch, composer (b. 1747)
 May 10 – Greta Naterberg, folk singer (b. 1772)
 May 18 – Maddalena Laura Sirmen, violinist, singer and composer (b. 1745)
 August 25 – Elizabeth Billington, opera singer (b. 1768)
October 22 – Joachim Heinrich Campe, lyricist and writer (born 1818)
 December – Mikhail Kerzelli, pianist, violinist and composer (b. c. 1740)
 December 31 – Jean-Pierre Duport, cellist (b. 1741)

References 

 
19th century in music
Music by year